Ashville or Asheville may refer to:

Places

United States
 Ashville, Alabama
 Ashville, Louisville, Kentucky
 Ashville, New York
 Asheville, North Carolina
 Asheville metropolitan area
 Asheville School
 Asheville High School
 Asheville Regional Airport
 Ashville, Ohio
Ashville Depot, a former train station
 Ashville, Pennsylvania

Elsewhere
 Ashville, South Australia, Australia
 Ashville, Manitoba, Canada
Ashville Formation, a geological formation in Canada
 Ashville College, in Harrogate, England

Ships
 Asheville-class gunboat 
 Asheville-class gunboat (1917)
 , the name of several U.S. Navy ships

Other uses

See also 

Ashville Historic District (disambiguation)